The John Alma Adams House is a historic house located at 625 East Two Hundred South in Pleasant Grove, Utah.

Description and history 
It was built with soft-rock exterior walls in 1877, and was renovated and extended in 1889.

It was listed on the National Register of Historic Places on June 9, 1987; and the listing included two contributing buildings.

References

Houses on the National Register of Historic Places in Utah
Houses completed in 1877
Houses in Utah County, Utah
National Register of Historic Places in Utah County, Utah
Buildings and structures in Pleasant Grove, Utah
1877 establishments in Utah Territory